Ian Heddle (born 21 March 1963) is a Scottish former footballer, who played for Dunfermline Athletic, St Johnstone, Forfar Athletic and Brechin City in the Scottish Football League. He also had a brief stint with Newcastle Breakers in the Australian National Soccer League.

References

1963 births
Living people
Footballers from Dunfermline
Scottish footballers
Association football midfielders
Dunfermline Athletic F.C. players
St Johnstone F.C. players
Forfar Athletic F.C. players
Brechin City F.C. players
Kelty Hearts F.C. players
Scottish Football League players
Scottish Junior Football Association players
National Soccer League (Australia) players
Newcastle Breakers FC players
Scottish expatriate sportspeople in Australia
Scottish expatriate footballers
Expatriate soccer players in Australia